The 203rd New York State Legislature, consisting of the New York State Senate and the New York State Assembly, met from January 9, 2019, to December 31, 2020, during the ninth and tenth years of Andrew Cuomo's governorship, in Albany.

Key legislation
 Gender Expression Non-Discrimination Act
 Reproductive Health Act (S2796)
 Comprehensive Contraception Coverage Act
 Cannabis and Taxation Act
 Jose Peralta New York state DREAM Act
 Climate Leadership and Community Protection Act
 Child Victims Act
 Greenlight Act
 Farm Laborers Fair Labor Practices Act

State Senate

Senators

The asterisk (*) denotes members of the previous Legislature who continued in office as members of this Legislature. James Skoufis changed from the Assembly to the Senate.

Note: For brevity, the chairmanships omit the words "...the Committee on (the)..."

State Assembly

Assembly members

Note: For brevity, the chairmanships omit the words "...the Committee on (the)..."

+Elected in a special election

References

Sources
Senate election results at NYS Board of Elections

New York (state) legislative sessions
2019 in New York (state)
2020 in New York (state)
2019 U.S. legislative sessions
2020 U.S. legislative sessions